The Peanut Hole was an area of open ocean at the center of the Sea of Okhotsk until 2014. From 1991 to 2014 its status was the subject of international disputes, although since March 2014 Peanut Hole's seabed and subsoil is legally part of the continental shelf of Russia.

EEZs are not areas of sovereignty, but are areas of certain sovereign rights and functional jurisdiction. Since the Peanut Hole was not in the Russian EEZ, any country could fish there, and some began doing so in large numbers in 1991, removing perhaps as much as one million metric tons of pollock in 1992. This was seen by the Russian Federation as presenting a danger to Russian fish stocks, since the fish move in and out of the Peanut Hole from the Russian EEZ. (This situation is called a "straddling stock".)

In 1993, China, Japan, Poland, Russia and South Korea agreed to stop fishing in the Peanut Hole until the pollock stocks recovered, but without an agreement on how to proceed after that, while the United Nations Straddling Fish Stocks Agreement, which became effective in 2001, created a framework intended to help implement cooperative management of straddling stocks. 

The Russian Federation petitioned the United Nations to declare the Peanut Hole to be part of Russia's continental shelf.  In November 2013, a United Nations subcommittee accepted the Russian argument, and in March 2014 the full United Nations Commission on the Limits of the Continental Shelf ruled in favor of the Russian Federation.

References

Further reading

Sea of Okhotsk
Borders of Russia
Fishing in Russia
Fishing conflicts
Disputed waters